Dinnington St. John's is a civil parish in the Metropolitan Borough of Rotherham, South Yorkshire, England.  The parish contains nine listed buildings that are recorded in the National Heritage List for England.  Of these, one is listed at Grade I, the highest of the three grades, one is at Grade II*, the middle grade, and the others are at Grade II, the lowest grade.  The parish contains the town of Dinnington, the hamlet of Throapham, and the surrounding countryside.  Most of the listed buildings are houses and associated structures, and the others are a church, and the remains of a medieval cross. 


Key

Buildings

References

Citations

Sources

 

Lists of listed buildings in South Yorkshire
Buildings and structures in the Metropolitan Borough of Rotherham